Léon Hubert Charpentier (22 August 1859 – 12 May 1945) was a French politician who represented Ardennes in the French Senate from 1920 to 1930.

Family 
His grandson Gilles Charpentier was Socialist Member of Parliament for Ardennes's 3rd constituency from 1981 to 1986.

See also 

 List of senators of Ardennes

References 

1859 births
1945 deaths
20th-century French politicians
Members of the 11th Chamber of Deputies of the French Third Republic
Members of Parliament for Ardennes
Senators of Ardennes (department)